The 2018–19 Coastal Carolina Chanticleers men's basketball team represents Coastal Carolina University during the 2018–19 NCAA Division I men's basketball season. The Chanticleers, led by 12th-year head coach Cliff Ellis, play their home games at the HTC Center in Conway, South Carolina as members of the Sun Belt Conference. They finished the season 17-17, 9-9 in Sun Belt Play to tor for 6th place. They lost in the second round of the Sun Belt tournament to Louisiana-Monroe. They received an at-large bid to the College Basketball Invitational where they defeated Howard and West Virginia to advance to the semifinals where they lost to DePaul.

Previous season
The Chanticleers finished the 2017–18 season 14–18, 8–10 in Sun Belt play to finish in eighth place. They lost in the first round of the Sun Belt tournament to Texas State.

Roster

Schedule and results

|-
!colspan=9 style=| Exhibition

|-
!colspan=9 style=| Non-conference regular season

|-
!colspan=9 style=| Sun Belt Conference regular season

|-
!colspan=9 style=| Sun Belt tournament

|-
!colspan=9 style=| College Basketball Invitational

References

Coastal Carolina Chanticleers men's basketball seasons
Coastal Carolina
Coastal Carlina
Coastal Carlina
Coastal Carolina